Montez is a surname. Notable people bearing the name include:

António Montez (1885–1968), Portuguese sports shooter
Carlos Montez Melancia (born 1927), former governor of Macau
Chris Montez (Ezekiel Christopher Montanez, born 1943), American singer
Lola Montez (Marie Dolores Eliza Rosanna Gilbert, Countess of Landsfeld, 1821–1861), Irish dancer and actress
 Lola Montez (musical), 1958
 "Lola Montez" (song), by Volbeat, 2013
 Lola Montez (1918 film), a German silent film
 Lola Montez (1919 film), a loose sequel
 Lola Montez, the King's Dancer, a 1922 German silent historical drama film
Maria Montez (María África Gracia Vidal, 1912–1951), Dominican-born actress known as "The Queen of Technicolor"
María Montez International Airport, Barahona, Dominican Republic
María Montez metro station, Dominican Republic
Mario Montez (René Rivera, 1935–2013), Puerto Rican cross dresser and drag queen
Ricardo Montez (Levy Isaac Attias, 1923–2010), British actor
Ron Montez (fl. 1970s/80s), ballroom dancer and choreographer
Steven Montez (born 1997), American football player
Tim Montez (born 1961), American baseball coach

Fictional characters
 Gabriella Montez, a character in the High School Musical film series
 Wildcat (Yolanda Montez), a superheroine in the DC Comics universe

See also

Lola Montez (disambiguation)